Müge Boz (born 13 April 1984) is a Turkish actress and model.

Life and career 
Boz's mother is a Bosniak Yugoslavian immigrant and her father is from the Aegean Region. She has a sister. She spent her childhood in Istanbul, but at the age of 12 she moved with her family to Karşıyaka in İzmir due to her father's job demands.

Boz graduated from İzmir Atatürk High School. Then she finished her studies at Anadolu University with a degree in Cinema, TV and Public Relations studies. She subsequently received a scholarship from the school named Hogskulen i Volda in Norway and received 'strategic design' and 'digital photography' training afterwards. She studied ballet for 11 years and piano for 4 years.

In 2009, she appeared in a commercial for Turkcell and the following year she was cast in commercials for Arçelik, Maximum Kart and Nescafe. In 2011, she played the character of Meltem in the series Şüphe and Ada in the series Karakol.

Aside from her acting career she has also practiced modelling. In 2010, she was chosen as the advertising face for Zen Diamonds. A breakthrough in her career came with her role in hit surreal comedy series Leyla ile Mecnun. She then had a role in TRT 1 series Gurbette Aşk.

Filmography

Series

Films

References

External links 
 
 

1984 births
Turkish television actresses
Turkish film actresses
Turkish female models
Living people
Actresses from Istanbul
Turkish people of Bosniak descent